Colonial Airlines was a United States airline from 1942 to 1956 with bases at LaGuardia Airport (LGA) in New York City and at Montréal/St-Hubert Airport in Montreal, Canada.

History
It was founded as Canadian Colonial Airways on 6 March 1928 to operate Foreign Air Mail Route No. 1 (FAM-1) from New York to Montreal via Albany, New York. Services began to Canada on 1 October 1928. The Fairchild FC-2 was among the aircraft types used. After acquisition by a group of investors, the airline was renamed Colonial Airlines on 1 May 1942.

Postwar period

The airline was awarded a route from Washington, D.C. to Montreal and Ottawa on 10 August 1945, followed by routes to Bermuda in May 1946. Scheduled flights to the latter began on 1 August 1947. The shorter routes were operated by Douglas DC-3s and the longer routes by Douglas DC-4s.

By 1956, Colonial's executive offices were on Park Avenue in New York City and it was flying several routes including five daily nonstop DC-4 flights between LGA and Montreal. It also operated a nonstop DC-4 flight departing LGA at 11 am EST to Bermuda, arriving at Kindley Field 3:35 pm AST, with a "full course hot meal" served en route, its timetables advertised. It also offered a DC-3
puddle jumper flight from LGA making an 11:50 am Monday–Friday flag stop at Poughkeepsie's Dutchess County Airport en route to Montreal and Ottawa, Canada, with intermediate stops at Albany, New York, Rutland, Vermont, and Burlington, Vermont.

Merger with Eastern Air Lines
The airline operated for a period of five years during which a fierce competition was fought for its control between Eastern Air Lines and National Airlines. After several reversals of government policy, Eastern Airlines emerged as the acquirer and the operational merger took place on 1 June 1956. A few years following the merger, many of the Colonial's more rural destinations were deleted from Eastern's route network. Eastern was bought by Texas Air Corporation in 1986. In 1991 Eastern Airlines ceased operation and some of its assets were assigned to Continental Airlines. In 2010 Continental merged with United Airlines.

Destinations

Maryland
Baltimore (Friendship International Airport) now BWI
New York
Albany (Albany International Airport)
Buffalo (Buffalo Niagara International Airport)
Glens Falls (Floyd Bennett Memorial Airport)*
Massena (Massena International Airport)
Malone (Malone-Dufort Airport)
New York (LaGuardia Airport)
Plattsburgh (Clinton County Airport)*
Poughkeepsie (Dutchess County Airport)*
Saranac Lake (Adirondack Regional Airport)
Syracuse (Syracuse Hancock International Airport)
Watertown (Watertown International Airport)
Ontario, Canada
Toronto (Toronto Pearson International Airport)
Ottawa (Ottawa Macdonald–Cartier International Airport)
Pennsylvania
Reading (Reading Regional Airport)*
Wilkes-Barre/Scranton (Wilkes-Barre/Scranton International Airport
Quebec, Canada
Montréal (Montréal-Dorval)
Vermont
Burlington (Burlington International Airport)
Rutland (Rutland State Airport)
Virginia
Washington, D.C. (Ronald Reagan Washington National Airport)
Bermuda
Kindley Field, now Bermuda International Airport

''Those airports marked with an asterisk (*) no longer have scheduled passenger air service.

See also 
 List of defunct airlines of the United States

Bibliography

References

External links
 AirTimes.com
 Eastern Airlines History
 Colonial Airlines Timetables

Eastern Air Lines
Defunct regional airlines of the United States
Airlines established in 1928
Airlines disestablished in 1956
Airlines based in New York (state)